Luba, officially the Municipality of Luba, is a 5th class municipality in the province of Abra, Philippines. According to the 2020 census, it has a population of 6,518 people.

History

The earliest known settlement in the municipality of Luba was in Barit. It was then a thickly forested area with tall and big trees interconnected with myriads of rattan vines called barit. The early settlers were hunters as the place was abundant with wild pigs, deer and fruit trees.

The home of fine quality of rattan, Barit increased in population so that another settlement in a nearby place emerged. They called this Barit-Luzong. Southwest of Barit, another settlement occurred and they called this Barit-Lulluno. Barit-Amtuagan soon followed. It is only after a considerable period of time that the settlement of Bancagan (now the capital of the municipality) took place. The old folks has it that the river banks were being avoided due to the presence of a deadly reptiles called buaya. But in the middle part of the 18th century settlement near river banks begun to flourish the old folks surmised that half a century earlier, settlers from the uplands had turn to "slash and burn" farming. A destructive method that almost dissipated the tall and big premium hardwood trees. As a consequence flash flood occurred that resulted to siltation in the deep river bed portion virtually neutralized the hiding place of these buayas. Exposed to attack, their number were kept into a minimum.

The first formal collective name of the municipality of Luba was Barit-Amtuagan, presumably to include all other settlers from the east side of the kayan (river). This is located south east of Barit near the Damalin River, the biggest tributary of the Abra river. After sometime, some influential leaders from Barit-Lulluno had caused the transfer of collective capital from Barit-Amtuagan to Barit-Lulluno. For many years, Barit-Lulluno lingered until the onset of the American Regime.

In 1917 or probably earlier, the name of Luba was formally adopted as the official name of the municipality. Accordingly, it was a fusion of the first two letters of Lulluno and Barit.

Creation of the Municipality Luba, founded in 1912 or probably earlier finally appeared in the population census in 1918. One and a half centuries earlier, the core settlement at Barit has gradually transformed into a pueblo in the middle part of the 18th century and believed to be a part of the military district of Villavieja.

The first capital of the town and seat of the municipal government was in Luzong, 4 km away from the original settlement at Barit. But in 1920, Caoatig Valera, the third presidente of the municipality of Luba transferred the town capital to Bancagan (now Poblacion) in answer to the clamor of some influential people in that sitio.

Luba now consist of eight barangays scattered in a 20,850-hectare territory with an average of 3 km apart. It has two valleys: the upper and the lower. The town's geographical location has been a major factor in her slow-paced development that she is often tagged as a marginalized community of Abra.

Geography
It is bounded on the north by the municipality of Manabo; north-east by Boliney; east by Tubo; south by San Emilio, and west by Villaviciosa.

According to the Philippine Statistics Authority, the municipality has a land area of  constituting  of the  total area of Abra.

Barangays
Luba is politically subdivided into eight barangays. These barangays are headed by elected officials: Barangay Captain, Barangay Council, whose members are called Barangay Councilors. All are elected every three years.

Climate

Demographics

In the 2020 census, Luba had a population of 6,518.

Economy

Government
Luba, belonging to the lone congressional district of the province of Abra, is governed by a mayor designated as its local chief executive and by a municipal council as its legislative body in accordance with the Local Government Code. The mayor, vice mayor, and the councilors are elected directly by the people through an election which is being held every three years.

Elected officials

Accessibility
Luba is accessible from Benguet/Baguio by vehicle via the Naguilian Road down to San Fernando City, traversing the province of Ilocos Sur to the municipality of Narvacan, then continuing to Bangued. The Bangued–Luba route is seasonal for vehicular traffic (November–June). However the Bangued–Salnec Bucay Road is an all-weather one, and an intermittent section along the Manabo-Luba Road is not passable during typhoons/storms, so the only way to go to and from the town is by crossing the Abra River twice.

References

External links 

 [ Philippine Standard Geographic Code]
 Municipality of Luba

Municipalities of Abra (province)
Populated places on the Abra River